Syzygium monimioides is a rainforest tree of tropical Queensland, Australia. Known only from near Cooktown, it is a locally common understorey tree, which can have up to 30 trunks per mature plant.

References

monimioides
Myrtales of Australia
Flora of Queensland
Ornamental trees
Trees of Australia